Booneville Airport may refer to:

 Booneville Municipal Airport in Booneville, Arkansas, United States (FAA: 4M2)
 Booneville/Baldwyn Airport in Booneville/Baldwyn, Mississippi, United States (FAA: 8M1)

See also
Boonville Airport (disambiguation)